Annika Dahlman (born January 24, 1964) is a former Swedish cross-country skier who competed during the 1980s. She won a bronze medal in the 4 × 5 km relay at the 1987 FIS Nordic World Ski Championships in Oberstdorf and finished seventh in the 5 km event at those championships.

Dahlman's best career individual finish was second in a 10 km World Cup event at Calgary in 1987.

Cross-country skiing results
All results are sourced from the International Ski Federation (FIS).

Olympic Games

World Championships
 1 medals – (1 bronze)

World Cup

Season standings

Individual podiums

1 podium

Team podiums

 1 victory 
 2 podiums 

Note:   Until the 1999 World Championships, World Championship races were included in the World Cup scoring system.

References

External links
World Championship results 

1964 births
Living people
Swedish female cross-country skiers
FIS Nordic World Ski Championships medalists in cross-country skiing
People from Skövde Municipality
Olympic cross-country skiers of Sweden
Cross-country skiers at the 1988 Winter Olympics